Thomas Howell was a professional rugby league footballer who played in the 1890s and 1900s.

Playing career
Howell appears to have scored no drop-goals (or field-goals as they are currently known in Australasia), but prior to the 1974–75 season all goals, whether; conversions, penalties, or drop-goals, scored 2-points, consequently prior to this date drop-goals were often not explicitly documented, therefore '0' drop-goals may indicate drop-goals not recorded, rather than no drop-goals scored. In addition, prior to the 1949–50 season, the archaic field-goal was also still a valid means of scoring points.

References

External links

 Search for "Howell" at rugbyleagueproject.org

Place of birth missing
Place of death missing
Rugby league centres
English rugby league players
Wakefield Trinity players
Year of birth missing
Year of death missing